MTV Hits is an Australian and New Zealand subscription music channel focused on hit music. The channel first launched in Australia in April 2007 (as The Music Factory), and later launched in New Zealand on 1 December 2011.

The channel closed on 1 December 2015 to be replaced in all markets by MTV Music, but was revived 5 years later on 1 July 2020 as a rebrand of MTV Music.

History

MTV Hits Australia & Hits first launched as TMF Australia in April 2007 on the Optus Television pay TV service and allowed viewers to interact with the channel via the web and mobile (3G Network) commencing on 22 June 2007. Unlike sister channel MTV, the channel only played music related programming. The channel was said to be picked up by cable TV providers Foxtel and Austar as a standalone channel soon, but was available via the interactive My MTV Service.

Relaunch as MTV Hits
TMF was relaunched as MTV Hits on 1 November 2010. The channel later launched in New Zealand on Sky Television on 1 December 2011.

On 1 July 2011 MTV International channels launched new logos

Cessation of Service in Australia
On 29 October 2013, MTV announced they had been working with Foxtel since early 2013 to offer more diversity on the Foxtel platform, as MTV Classic and MTV Hits fought for the same audience as Foxtel Networks channels MAX and [V] Hits respectively. The channel to replace MTV Hits is MTV Music, the number one UK music channel, which will feature Pop, Rock, urban and alternative music. Although MTV Classic and MTV Hits will no longer be available on Foxtel, they will continue to be offered by Australian IPTV service Fetch TV and New Zealand pay TV provider Sky Television. The changes took place on 3 December 2013.

On 16 December 2013, FetchTV announced via their Facebook page that as of 1 January 2014, MTV Music would replace MTV Hits on their service, as was done by Foxtel the month earlier. This meant that MTV Hits would become exclusively available in New Zealand.

Closure of channel in New Zealand
On 1 December 2015, Sky Television replaced MTV Hits (and sister channel MTV Classic) with a localized version of MTV Music. Ultimately, this resulted in the closure of the channel, as Sky was the last remaining provider of MTV Hits.

Revival
On 1 July 2020, the channel returned to Foxtel channel 801, taking the slot of Channel [V] and replacing MTV Music, alongside Fetch TV and Sky (New Zealand).

Programming

Current Shows (2020-onwards)
 Mornings on MTV
 Best of the Week: Top 30
 Trending Right Now
 The Evolution of...
 Most Shazammed: Top 30
 After Party
 Official Global Chart
 Up Late on MTV
 Billboard Chart
 Weekend Vibes Only
 Wake Up with MTV
 Hip Hop x RnB Party
 MTV Upload 
 Fresh Finds by MTV
 Local Finds by MTV
 MTV House Party
 Most Streamed Songs
 After Hours

Previous programmes
 My Pix – Music videos are played while viewers' answers to questions are shown
 Today's Most Wanted – Music played as voted by viewers on the MTV website
 U Control – Music chosen by a single viewer
 Double Play – 2 songs, of a certain artist, back-to-back are played
 MTV Hits Top 30 – The top 30 songs in the country
 30 Biggest Tracks Right Now – The top 30 songs in the country
 10 Biggest Tracks Right Now – The top 10 songs in the country
 Fresh Vid – Newest video by a certain artist. The artist's name is also in the title, Fresh Vid: Reece Mastin, for example
 Burst Of... – A few songs of a certain artist is played. The artist's name is also in the title, Burst Of...Timomatic, for example
 Nothing But MTV Hits – Songs played at nighttime
 Pop Hits Top 6 – The top 6 pop songs in the country
 Party Hits – Party songs
 MTV News – The news as told by MTV
 Brekkie Hits – Songs played in the early hours
 Urban Hits Top 6" – The top 6 urban songs in the country
 ...vs..." – Songs are played by two different artists, One Direction vs. Justin Bieber, for example
 MTV Download Charts – Songs played according to the download charts
 #Hits – Music videos are played out while viewers' answer to questions posted on MTV Hits' Facebook and Twitter accounts.

TMF Shows
 Study Free Zone
 Booty Beats
 Daily Downloads
 Top 6 at 6
 Eye Candy
 Snitch and Bitch
 Fresh New Ones
 TMF Top 20 Download
 TMF X2
 Top 20 Theme:
 Top 20 Australian Charts
 Top 20 Pop
 Top 20 Rock
 Top 20 Urban
 Ultimate Top 100
 Vidcast – Videos that are created by viewers on mobile phones and are aired on the show.

Logos

References

External links

MTV channels
Music video networks in Australia
Music video networks in New Zealand
English-language television stations in Australia
English-language television stations in New Zealand
Television channels and stations established in 2007
Television channels and stations established in 2011
2011 establishments in New Zealand
Television channels and stations disestablished in 2014
2014 disestablishments in Australia
Television channels and stations disestablished in 2015
2015 disestablishments in New Zealand
Television channels and stations established in 2020
2020 establishments in Australia
2020 establishments in New Zealand
Television channel articles with incorrect naming style